The Wyodak mine is a coal mine in Wyodak, Wyoming, United States, located about  east of Gillette in the coal-rich Powder River Basin.

Description

The operation is an open pit mine that utilizes a truck and shovel mining method to produce a low-sulfur, sub-bituminous coal that is used for domestic energy generation. The mine ships its coal to the adjacent Wyodak power plant and to other customers via railroad. The mine is operated by Wyodak Resources Development, a subsidiary of the Black Hills Corporation.

As of 2009, Wyodak had reserves of 294mm tons of sub-bituminous coal and a maximum permitted production capacity of 10mm tons per year. Typical annual production has been in the 5-6mm ton range for the last several years though. In 2008, the mine produced just over 6.0 million short tons of coal, making it the 30th-largest producer of coal in the United States.

The average quality of the coal produced from the Wyodak Mine is 8,050 BTU/lb, 0.40% Sulfur, 6.0% Ash, and 0.94% Sodium (of the ash). Train loading operations at the mine are done by a flood loading system that is coupled to a "weigh-in-motion" track scale system. Silo capacity at the mine's rail loop, which can accommodate a single unit train, is 24,000 tons.

History
Mining operations at the mine site first began around 1918 with the establishment of the Peerless Mine. The Peerless Mine was an underground room and pillar operation that mined coal near the outcrop of the Wyodak seam. Though the operation went out of business in 1925, it left behind underground workings which were uncovered and mined through by the Wyodak mine in the 1950s.

The modern Wyodak mine was established in 1923 to provide coal for power plants that supplied energy to the Homestake Mine (South Dakota) for its mining and milling operations. In 1956, the Black Hills Corporation purchased the mine from the Homestake Mining Company by exercising an option that was negotiated during its purchase of the Wyodak power plant in 1954.

It is believed that Wyodak is the oldest, continually operated surface coal mine in the United States.

Production

See also

 List of coal mines in the United States

References

External links

 

Mines in Campbell County, Wyoming
Mines in Wyoming
Coal mines in the United States